Central Iran consists of the southern slopes of the Alborz Mountains in the north, the Zagros Mountains in south, the Central Iranian Range, and the desert of Dasht-e Kavir.

It includes the provinces of Esfahan, Yazd, Chahar Mahal and Bakhtiari, Markazi, Qazvin, Alborz, Tehran, Qom and Semnan. 

The major cities are Tehran, Isfahan, Arak, Yazd, Karaj, Qazvin, Qom, Kashan, Saveh and Shahr-e Kord.

Climate
Hot desert climate in the deserts.
Cold desert climate in the central mountains.
Humid continental climate on the few rivers.
cold semi-arid climate in the high mountains.

See also
 Northern Iran
 Western Iran
 Northwestern Iran
 Eastern Iran
 Southern Iran

References

Subdivisions of Iran
Iran